4828 Misenus  is a larger Jupiter trojan from the Trojan camp, approximately  in diameter. It was discovered on 11 September 1988, by American astronomer Carolyn Shoemaker at the Palomar Observatory in California. The dark Jovian asteroid has a rotation period of 12.9 hours. It was named after Aeneas' trumpeter, Misenus, from Greek mythology.

Orbit and classification 

Misenus is a dark Jovian asteroid in a 1:1 orbital resonance with Jupiter. It is located in the trailering Trojan camp at the Gas Giant's  Lagrangian point, 60° behind on its orbit . It is also a non-family asteroid of the Jovian background population.

It orbits the Sun at a distance of 4.9–5.4 AU once every 11 years and 9 months (4,288 days; semi-major axis of 5.17 AU). Its orbit has an eccentricity of 0.04 and an inclination of 15° with respect to the ecliptic. The body's observation arc begins with its first observation at Palomar in August 1988, just one month prior to its official discovery observation.

Physical characteristics 

Misenus is an assumed, carbonaceous C-type asteroid. It has a V–I color index of 0.92, typical for most D-type asteroids.

Rotation period 

In April 1995, a rotational lightcurve of Misenus was obtained from photometric observations over three nights by Italian astronomer Stefano Mottola using the Bochum 0.61-metre Telescope at ESO's La Silla Observatory in Chile. Lightcurve analysis gave a well-defined rotation period of  hours with a brightness amplitude of 0.33 magnitude.

Diameter and albedo 

According to the surveys carried out by the Japanese Akari satellite and the NEOWISE mission of NASA's Wide-field Infrared Survey Explorer, Misenus measures 43.22 and 45.95 kilometers in diameter and its surface has an albedo of 0.098 and 0.063, respectively. The Collaborative Asteroid Lightcurve Link assumes a standard albedo for a carbonaceous asteroid of 0.057 and calculates a diameter of 46.30 kilometers based on an absolute magnitude of 10.4.

Naming 

This minor planet was named by the discoverer from Greek mythology after the Trojan Misenus, who was Aeneas' herald and trumpeter. He was drowned by Triton for challenging the gods to a musical contest by blowing on a conch shell. The official naming citation was published by the Minor Planet Center on 25 August 1991.

References

External links 
 Asteroid Lightcurve Database (LCDB), query form (info )
 Dictionary of Minor Planet Names, Google books
 Discovery Circumstances: Numbered Minor Planets (1)-(5000) – Minor Planet Center
 Asteroid 4828 Misenus at the Small Bodies Data Ferret
 
 

004828
Discoveries by Carolyn S. Shoemaker
Named minor planets
19880911